Brisson was a 22-gun corvette of the French Navy.

Career 
Brisson was built as a fluyt for the Mississippi Company. She became property of the Crown on 8 December 1769 with the liquidation of the Company, and commissioned as a light frigate. She was sold to the commerce circa September 1771. 

She returned to the service of the Crown when the French requisitioned in July 1778 for the defence of Pondicherry. She was captured by the British at Pondicherry in September 1778.

Notes, citations, and references

Notes

Citations

References
 

 

Frigates of the French Navy
1767 ships